David John Terbrugge (born 31 January 1977) is a former cricketer, who played in seven Test matches and four One Day Internationals for the South Africa national cricket team between 1998 and 2004. A back injury caused his early retirement. Terbrugge bowled right-arm fast-medium deliveries and batted right-handed as a tailender.

Having been a talented player at schoolboy level, Terbrugge was part South Africa's under-19 tour of England in 1995 when he suffered a back injury and had to return home early. He was then aged 18 and the injury could have ended his career, but he recovered and became a full international bowler. He needed an ankle operation in 1999, but again he recovered well and carried on playing for South Africa.

Terbrugge took 4/20 on his ODI debut against Pakistan in 2000 and won the Player of the Match award in a South African win. He took 5/46 against Bangladesh in 2002, his best bowling in a Test match, although he did not play again for the side for a year and a half. He played domestically for Gauteng and Highveld Lions, before an injury in 2005 forced his retirement from all cricket at the age of 29.

References

External links 

1977 births
Living people
South Africa One Day International cricketers
South Africa Test cricketers
South African cricketers
Gauteng cricketers
Lions cricketers
Alumni of St Stithians College